The 1917–18 William & Mary Indians men's basketball team represented the College of William & Mary in intercollegiate basketball during the 1917–18 season. Under the first, and only, year of head coach Harry Young (who also served as head football coach), the team finished the season with a 6–11 record. This was the 13th season in program history for William & Mary, whose nickname is now the Tribe.

William & Mary played in-state rival Washington & Lee for the first time during 1918.

Schedule

|-
!colspan=9 style="background:#006400; color:#FFD700;"| Regular season

Source

References

William & Mary Tribe men's basketball seasons
William And Mary Indians
William and Mary Indians Men's Basketball Team
William and Mary Indians Men's Basketball Team